The 2009-10 Minnesota State Mavericks women's ice hockey season took place under head coach Eric Means.

Offseason
May 11: Eric Means was named head coach
June 19: Shari Vogt was named assistant coach
August 4: Jon Austin was named assistant coach; Dean Williamson joined the staff as a volunteer assistant coach
September 9: Defenseman Holly Snyder and forward Christina Lee were named as WCHA All-Stars; they were among 22 conference players to face the 2009-10 U.S women’s national team in St. Paul, Minn. on September 25.

Regular season
January 14: Junior forward Nina Tikkinen was named to Finland's 2010 Winter Olympic Hockey Team

Standings

Roster

Schedule

Player stats

Skaters

Goaltenders

Postseason
February 27: After 3 hours and 47 minutes, Emily West scored at 1:16 of triple overtime to eliminate the MSU-Mankato Mavericks.

WCHA Playoffs

Awards and honors
Alli Altmann, WCHA Defensive Player of the Week (Week of February 17, 2010) 
Emmi Leinonen, WCHA Offensive Player of the Week 
Ashley Young, Frozen Four Skills Competition participant

References

External links
Official site

Minnesota State-Mankato
Minnesota State Mavericks women's ice hockey seasons